Pove Pora (Telugu: పోవే పోరా) is an Indian youth game show that telecasted on ETV Plus produced by Mallemala Entertainments. The First episode aired on 20 July 2017. The show became an instant hit and received well by audience. This youth game show focuses on competition, debate, quiz between boys and girls on various topics and one with highest points will be announced as winners of the episode.

The show is hosted by Sudigali Sudheer and Anchor Vishnupriya. The boys' side is supported and led by Sudheer and the girls' side is supported and led by Vishnupriya. Hosts also seen performing for Intro songs which has separate fan base. Apart from encouraging their sides, the hosts always seen doing comedy by making comedy punches on each other.

The show telecasts on ETV Plus on Saturdays at 08.00 PM IST. All episodes of the show are fully available on official YouTube channel of ETV Plus Network . The shows has good number of views on YouTube garnering at least one million views for each episodes. The show completed its 100th Episode on 15 June 2019.

Hosts

Format 

 Currently Running     Discontinued

Episodes
The episodes are usually one hour show with commercials. In the beginning, show was aired on every Thursday from 8:00 PM to 9:00 PM. From 1 March 2018, show moved to Friday telecasted on same time slot.  Show again rescheduled on 16 March 2019 and currently air from 8:00 PM to 9:00 PM on Saturday.  The format included a scripted act from the hosts in the initial segment followed by three segments that include debate, quiz and game. The first 25 episodes began with three segments. Later on Intro songs were included. The format of the show continue to be same with changes only in three rounds.

Special Episodes

Trivia
 The show is a Debut show for both Sudigali Sudheer and Vishnupriya as Television Host.
 Pove Pora is Sudigali Sudheer's fourth show with 'Mallemala Entertainments' after Jabardasth, Extra Jabardasth and Dhee Ultimate Dance Show.
 The show was directed by Santosh Errolla for almost 97 episodes. Currently show jointly directed by Prasanna Palanki and Srinivas Bodem.
 Sound technician of the show popularly called as 'Samba' by hosts is well known for audio skills.
 From episode 100 the makers have added two new actors Nukaraju and Fahima from Patas team. These two entertain the students with their different getups and actions in every episode.

See also 
Jabardasth
Extra Jabardasth
Dhee Ultimate Dance Show

References 

Indian game shows
2017 Indian television series debuts
Telugu-language television shows